The Armed Forces of the Russian Federation has a large number of Guards units.

Ground Forces

Guards Armies 
 1st Guards Tank Army
 2nd Guards Tank Army
 20th Guards Combined Arms Army

Guards Divisions

Motor Rifle 
 2nd Guards "Tamanskaya" Motor Rifle Division, (Cyrillic: гвардейская мотострелковая Таманская дивизия)
 18th Guards "Insterburgskaya" Motor Rifle Division
 20th Guards "Prikarpatsko-Berlinskaya" Motor Rifle Division, (Cyrillic: гвардейская мотострелковая Прикарпатско-Берлинская бригада)
 42nd Guards "Evpatoriyskaya" Motor Rifle Division
 144th Guards "Yelnya" Motor Rifle Division

Tank 
 4th Guards "Kantemirovskaya" Tank Division,  (Cyrillic: гвардейская танковая Кантемировская дивизия)
 47th Guards "Nizhniydneprovskaya" Tank Division
 90th Guards "Vitebsko-Novgorodskaya" Tank Division

Guards Brigades

Motor Rifle 

 15th Separate Guards "Alexandriyskaya" Motor Rifle Brigade
 21st Separate Guards "Novobug" Motor Rifle Brigade
 25th Separate Guards "Sevastopol" Motor Rifle Brigade "named after the Latvian Riflemen" 
 27th Separate Guards "Sevastopol" Motor Rifle Brigade
 35th Separate Guards "Stalingradsko-Kievskaya" Motor Rifle Brigade
 36th Separate Guards "Lozovaya" Motor Rifle Brigade
37th Separate Guards "Budapest Don Cossack" Motor Rifle Brigade
38th Separate Guards "Vitebskaya"  Motor Rifle Brigade
57th Separate Guards "Krasnograd" Motor Rifle Brigade
64th Separate Guards Motor Rifle Brigade (received Guards status on April 18, 2022)
70th Separate Guards "Dukhovshchina-Khingan" Motor Rifle Brigade
74th Separate Guards "Zvenigorod-Berlin" Motor Rifle Brigade
 136th "Umansko-Berlinskaya" Separate Guards Motorized Rifle Brigade
 138th Separate Guards "Krasnoselskaya" Motor Rifle Brigade

Tank 
 5th Separate Guards "Tatsinkaya" Tank Brigade
 10th Separate Guards "Uralsko-Lvovskaya Volunteers" Tank Brigade

Engineering 
 1st Guards Brest-Berlin Engineering Brigade
 11th Separate Guards Kingisepp Engineering Brigade
 12th Separate Guards Koenigsberg-Gorodok Engineering Brigade
 14th Separate Guards  Baranovichi  Engineering Brigade
 45th Guards Berlin Engineering Brigade

Artillery 
 9th Guards "Kielce-Berlin" Artillery Brigade
 79th Guards "Novozybkov" Rocket Artillery Brigade
 120th Guards Artillery Brigade
 338th Guards "Dvinskaya" Rocket Artillery Brigade
 385th Guards "Odesskaya" Artillery Brigade
 439th Guards "Perekop" Rocket Artillery Brigade

Other Guards units 
 1st Guards "Orshanskaya" Missile Brigade
 20th Guards "Berlin" Missile Brigade
 112th Guards "Novorossiysk" Missile Brigade
 212th Guards District Training Center
 467th Guards "Moscow-Tartu" District Training Center
 9th Guards "Lvov-Berlin" Headquarters Brigade
 3rd Guards "Warsaw-Berlin" Spetsnaz Brigade
 4th Guards Military Base

Disbanded Guards units 
 [[239th Guards Tank Regiment (Russia)|7th Separate Guards "Orenburg Cossack"  Tank Brigade]]
 8th Separate Guards "Kramatorsk" Motor Rifle Brigade
 8th Guards "Chertkovsky" Mountain Motor Rifle Brigade
 17th Separate Guards Motor Rifle Brigade
 18th Separate Guards "Yevpatoriya" Motor Rifle Brigade
 23rd Separate Guards "Petrokovskaya" Motor Rifle Brigade

Air ForceGuards formations of the Air Force3rd Guards Fighter Aviation Regiment 
14th Guards Fighter Aviation Regiment
23rd Guards Fighter Aviation Regiment 
120th Guards Fighter Aviation Regiment, Domna, 27 km southwest of Chita (MiG-29)
159th Guards Fighter Aviation Regiment
98th Separate Guards Mixed Aviation Regiment
42nd Guards Bomber Aviation Regiment (42 Gv BAP) (Su-24) (Verino - Pereyaslavka, Khabarovsk Kray) (to disband(?))
18th Guards Attack Aviation Regiment
6950th Guards Air Base
6980th Guards Air Base
1st Guards Mixed Aviation Division
303rd Guards Mixed Aviation Division

 Disbanded Guards units 
 1st Guards Fighter Aviation Regiment
 18th Guards Fighter Aviation Regiment
 19th Guards Fighter Aviation Regiment
 22nd Guards Fighter Aviation Regiment (PVO)
 28th Guards Fighter Aviation Regiment 
 31st Guards Fighter Aviation Regiment
 54th Guards Fighter Aviation Regiment 
 73rd Guards Fighter Aviation Regiment
 458th Guards Fighter Aviation Regiment
 627th Guards Fighter Aviation Training Regiment
 689th Guards Fighter Aviation Regiment (VVS Baltic Fleet)
 2nd Guards Bomber Aviation Regiment
 899th Guards Assault Aviation Regiment

Airborne
 Guards formations of the Airborne Troops''' (Cyrillic: гвардейские соединения воздушно-десантных войск):
7th Guards Airborne Division
 76th Guards Air Assault Division
 98th Guards Airborne Division
 106th Guards Airborne Division
 11th Guards Airborne Brigade
 31st Guards Airborne Brigade
 56th Guards Air Assault Brigade
 83rd Guards Airborne Brigade
 38th Guards Separate Communications Brigade
 45th Guards Separate Reconnaissance Brigade

Navy

 Guards formations of the Coastal Troops and Naval Infantry 
 336th Separate Guards Bialystok Marine Brigade
 79th Separate Guards Insterburg Motor Rifle Brigade
 152nd Separate Guards Brest-Warsaw Missile Brigade
 244th Separate Guards Neman Artillery Brigade
 7th Separate Guards Proletarian Moscow-Minsk Motor Rifle Regiment
 22nd Separate Guards Air Defense Missile Regiment
 69th Separate Guards Mogilev Marine Engineering Regiment

 Guards ships of the Navy (Cyrillic: гвардейские корабли) 
submarine D-3 (1929), NF, I series. Awarded on April 3, 1942.
Soviet submarine K-22 (1938), NF, XIV series. Awarded on April 3, 1942.
Soviet submarine M-171 (1937), NF, XII series. Awarded on April 3, 1942.
submarine M-174 (1937), NF, XII series. Awarded on April 3, 1942.
destroyer Stoykiy (1938), BF, project 7U. Awarded on April 3, 1942.
minelayer Marti, ex-Imperial yacht Shtandart (1895), BF. Awarded on April 3, 1942.
base minesweeper T-205 (Gafel`) (1938), BF, project 53U. Awarded on April 3, 1942.
submarine Shch-205 (1934), BSF, V-bis-2 series. Awarded on March 1, 1943.
submarine Shch-303 (1931), BF, III series. Awarded on March 1, 1943.
submarine Shch-309 (1935), BF, V-bis-2 series. Awarded on March 1, 1943.
submarine minelayer L-3 (1931), BF, II series. Awarded on March 1, 1943.
destroyer Gremiashchiy (1937), NF, project 7. Awarded on March 1, 1943.
destroyer Soobrazitel`nyi (1939), BSF, project 7U. Awarded on March 1, 1943.
base minesweeper T-411 (Zashchitnik) (1937), BSF, project 53. Awarded on March 1, 1943.
Soviet submarine M-35 (1940), BSF, XII series. Awarded on May 31, 1943.
submarine Shch-402 (1935), NF, X series. Awarded on July 25, 1943.
submarine Shch-422, ex-Shch-314 (1935), NF, X series. Awarded on July 25, 1943.
Soviet submarine M-172 (1937), NF, XII series. Awarded on July 25, 1943.
patrol boat № 065 (1938), BSF, MO-IV class. Awarded on July 25, 1943.
Soviet submarine S-33 (1939), BSF, IX-bis series. Awarded on July 22, 1944.
submarine Shch-215 (1937), BSF, X series. Awarded on July 22, 1944.
Soviet submarine M-62 (1939), BSF, XII series. Awarded on July 22, 1944.
Soviet submarine S-56 (1939), NF, IX-bis-2 series. Awarded on February 23, 1945.
patrol ship EK-2, ex-USS Long Beach (PF-34) (1943), PF, Tacoma-class. Awarded on August 22, 1945.
patrol ship Metel` (1934), PF, project 4. Awarded on August 26, 1945.
minelayer Okhotsk (1935), PF, Okean-class. Awarded on August 26, 1945.
minesweeper T-278, ex-USS Nucleus (AM-268) (1943), PF, Admirable-class. Awarded on August 26, 1945.
minesweeper T-281, ex-USS Peril (AM-272) (1943), PF, Admirable-class. Awarded on August 26, 1945.
Sverdlov, ex-Vyuga (1909), AMF, Shkval-class. Awarded on August 30, 1945.
monitor Sun Yat-sen, ex-Shkval (1909), AMF, Shkval-class. Awarded on August 30, 1945.
gunboat Krasnaya Zvezda, ex-Vogul (1907), AMF, Vogul-class. Awarded on August 30, 1945.
gunboat Proletariy, ex-Votyak (1907), AMF, Vogul-class. Awarded on August 30, 1945.
large guided missile ship Gremiashchiy (1959), NF, project 57bis. Succeeded Gremiashchiy (1937).
large anti-submarine ship Soobrazitel`nyi (1961), BSF, project 61. Succeeded Soobrazitel`nyi (1939).
Kynda class cruiser Varyag, ex-Soobrazitel`nyi (1963), PF, project 58. Succeeded Soobrazitel`nyi (1939) too.
seagoing minesweeper MT-205 (Gafel`) (1964), BF, project 266. Succeeded T-205 Gafel` (1938).
Soviet submarine K-22 (Krasnogvardeets) (1964), NF, project 675. Succeeded K-22 (1938).
Kashin class destroyer Krasnyi Kavkaz (1966), BSF, project 61. Succeeded Krasnyi Kavkaz (1916).
Kashin class destroyer Krasnyi Krym (1969), BSF, project 61. Succeeded Krasnyi Krym (1915).
destroyer Gremiashchiy (1987), NF, project 956. Succeeded Gremiashchiy (1959).
Russian cruiser Varyag, ex-Chervona Ukraina (1983), PF, project 1164. Succeeded Varyag (1963) in 1996.
guided missile cruiser Moskva, ex-Slava (1979), BSF, project 1164. Succeeded Krasnyi Kavkaz (1966) in 1998.
destroyer Gremiashchiy, ex-Bezuderzhnyi (1990), NF, project 956A. Succeeded Gremiashchiy (1987) in 2007.

Soviet ships
Soviet cruiser Krasnyi Krym (1915), BSF, Svetlana-class. Awarded on June 18, 1942.
Soviet cruiser Krasnyi Kavkaz (1916), BSF, Svetlana-class. Awarded on April 3, 1942.

Strategic Rocket Forces

Guards Rocket Armies 
 27th Guards Vitebsk Rocket Army
 33rd Guards Berislav Khingan Rocket Army

References 

 
Gua